Leo Carter (born 10 December 1994) is a New Zealand cricketer who plays for Canterbury. He is the son of former Canterbury and Northamptonshire batsman, and current White Ferns coach, Bob Carter.

Career 
He was part of New Zealand's squad for the 2014 ICC Under-19 Cricket World Cup. In June 2018, he was awarded a contract with Canterbury for the 2018–19 season. On 5 January 2020, in the 2019–20 Super Smash match between Canterbury and Northern Districts, Carter hit six sixes in one over off the bowling of Anton Devcich. He was the fourth batsman to do this in a Twenty20 match, and the first New Zealand cricketer.

In February 2020, in the match against Wellington in the 2019–20 Plunket Shield season, Carter scored his maiden double century in first-class cricket, finishing with an unbeaten 226. In June 2020, he was offered a contract by Canterbury ahead of the 2020–21 domestic cricket season, and in November 2020, he was named as the captain of Canterbury ahead of their 2020–21 Ford Trophy campaign.

References

External links
 

1994 births
Living people
New Zealand people of English descent
New Zealand cricketers
Canterbury cricketers
Cricketers from Wellington City